Chilonopsis subplicatus was a species of air-breathing land snails, terrestrial pulmonate gastropod molluscs in the family Achatinidae. This species was endemic to Saint Helena. It is now extinct.

References

subplicatus
Extinct gastropods
Gastropods described in 1844
Taxa named by George Brettingham Sowerby I
Taxonomy articles created by Polbot